Yves Apollinaire Pede (born 1959, in Abomey) is a Beninois Vodou artist. After being commissioned to reproduce reliefs for the Abomey Museum, he made sand paintings of well-known personalities such as Nelson Mandela. He gradually became oriented towards textile art, looking to Haitian and Cuban Vodou artists for inspiration. He is also noted for his large cement sculptures and bas-reliefs, and is stated to have a "special interest" in Kulito, a Fon word which literally means "the one from the path of death". He is based in Ouidah, the world centre for Vodun art, which has an annual festival.

References

1959 births
Living people
Beninese artists
Voodoo artists
People from Abomey